3367 Alex, provisional designation , is a background asteroid from the intermediate region of the asteroid belt, approximately  in diameter. It was discovered on 2 September 1993, by American astronomer Norman Thomas at Lowell's Anderson Mesa Station, near Flagstaff, Arizona, in the United States. The X-type asteroid has a rotation period of 9.6 hours. It was named after the grandson of the discoverer, Alex Baltutis.

Orbit and classification 

Alex is a non-family asteroid from the main belt's background population. It orbits the Sun in the central asteroid belt at a distance of 2.6–3.0 AU once every 4 years and 8 months (1,697 days). Its orbit has an eccentricity of 0.07 and an inclination of 5° with respect to the ecliptic.

Naming 

This minor planet was named by the discoverer after his grandson, Alex R. Baltutis. The official naming citation was published by the Minor Planet Center on 26 March 1986.

Physical characteristics 

In the SMASS classification, Alex is an X-type asteroid, while NASA's Wide-field Infrared Survey Explorer characterizes it as a bright E-type asteroid. Due to its intermediate albedo, the body may be of metallic composition.

Rotation period 

In February 2006 and April 2011, two rotational lightcurves of Alex were obtained from photometric observations made by French astronomers René Roy and Laurent Bernasconi, respectively. Such a low amplitude typically indicates that the body has a nearly spheroidal shape.

Diameter and albedo 

According to the space-based surveys carried out by the Japanese Akari satellite and by WISE with its subsequent NEOWISE mission, Alex has an albedo of 0.10, and measures 17.0 and 15.2 kilometers in diameter, respectively. The Collaborative Asteroid Lightcurve Link assumes a standard albedo for carbonaceous asteroids of 0.057 and calculates a diameter of 19.3 kilometers with an absolute magnitude of 12.3.

References

External links 
 Asteroid Lightcurve Database (LCDB), query form (info )
 Dictionary of Minor Planet Names, Google books
 Asteroids and comets rotation curves, CdR – Observatoire de Genève, Raoul Behrend
 Discovery Circumstances: Numbered Minor Planets (1)-(5000)  – Minor Planet Center
 
 

003367
Discoveries by Norman G. Thomas
Named minor planets
003367
19830215